The 2021 German Masters (officially the 2021 BildBet German Masters) was a professional ranking snooker tournament that took place from 27 to 31 January 2021. As a result of the COVID-19 pandemic, the tournament was staged at the Marshall Arena in Milton Keynes. The tournament was the eighth ranking event of the 2020–21 snooker season. It was the 15th edition of the German Masters, first held in 1995 as the 1995 German Open. Shaun Murphy made the sixth maximum break of his career in the first qualifying round against Chen Zifan.

The event featured a prize fund of £400,000 with £80,000 given to the winner. It was sponsored for the first time by BildBet, a subsidiary company created by BetVictor in collaboration with the local newspaper Bild. Despite the different name, the tournament was part of the BetVictor European Series. 

Judd Trump was the defending champion after defeating Neil Robertson 9–6 in the 2020 final. Trump met Jack Lisowski in the final, a repeat of the previous ranking event final, the World Grand Prix. It was the first time that the same two players had met in successive ranking event finals since John Higgins and Steve Davis met in the Welsh Open and International Open finals at the start of 1995. Trump won by 9 frames to 2, becoming the first player ever to successfully defend the title.

Prize fund
The event featured a total prize fund of £400,000 with the winner receiving £80,000. The event was the third of the "European Series" all sponsored by sports betting company BetVictor. The player accumulating the highest amount of prize money over the six events will receive a bonus of £150,000.

 Winner: £80,000
 Runner-up: £35,000
 Semi-final: £20,000
 Quarter-final: £10,000
 Last 16: £5,000
 Last 32: £4,000
 Last 64: £3,000
 Highest break: £5,000
 Total: £400,000

Main draw
Below are the event's results from the last-32 stage to the final. Player names in bold denote match winners. Numbers in brackets denote player seedings.

{{#invoke:RoundN|main|columns=5
|bold_winner=high
|short_brackets=yes
|team-width=220
|3rdplace=no
|RD1 = Last 32Best of 9 frames
|RD2 = Last 16Best of 9 frames
|RD3 = Quarter-finalsBest of 9 frames
|RD4=Semi-finalsBest of 11 frames
|RD5=FinalBest of 17 frames

||  (1)|5 ||1
|| |1 | (17)|5
|| |4 | (9)|5
|| |5 | (8)|4
||  (5)|4 ||5
|| |5 | (21)|2
||  (20)|5 ||4
||  (29)|4 ||5
|| |5 ||1
|| |4 ||5
||  (22)|5 ||0
||

Final

Qualifying
Qualifying for the event took place between 10 and 14 November 2020 at the Marshall Arena in Milton Keynes, England. There were two rounds of qualifying with matches being played as best-of-9 frames.

Round 1

Round 2

Century breaks

Main stage centuries

Total: 25

140, 133, 116, 101  Barry Hawkins
135, 113  Robbie Williams
134, 132, 131, 124, 104  Tom Ford
131, 131, 119, 101, 100  Judd Trump
128  Jack Lisowski
115  Louis Heathcote
114  Liang Wenbo
110  Stuart Bingham
104, 101  Ding Junhui
104  Jamie O'Neill
101  Jordan Brown
100  Jak Jones

Qualifying stage centuries 

Total: 58

References

2021
German Masters
Masters
Sport in Milton Keynes
German Masters
German Masters